William J. Murphy (17 May 1928 – 17 September 2018) was an Irish Labour Party politician.

He was elected as a Labour Party Teachta Dála (TD) for the Cork West constituency at the 1949 by-election on 15 June. His father, Timothy J. Murphy, the sitting TD and Minister for Local Government, had died on 29 April 1949. Aged 21 years and 29 days at the time, he is the youngest ever TD. 

Following his election to the Dail, he was elected to the Administrative Council of the Labour Party. In his maiden speech, he asked for Government contribution to rural development schemes to be increased from 75 percent in cases where small farmers could not afford to provide the remaining 25 percent towards costs. Murphy was elected as a Vice-President of Carbery Show Society in February 1950. He did not contest the 1951 general election. He went on to work for Cork County Council.

He died on 18 September 2018.

References

`

1928 births
2018 deaths
Labour Party (Ireland) TDs
Members of the 13th Dáil
Politicians from County Cork